Earle Henry Clements (June 29, 1931 – August 29, 2010) was a Canadian ice hockey player. He was a member of the East York Lyndhursts which won a silver medal at the 1954 World Ice Hockey Championships in Stockholm, Sweden representing Canada. He also played with the Stratford Kroehlers juniors.

References

1931 births
2010 deaths
Canadian ice hockey left wingers
East York Lyndhursts players
Stratford Kroehlers players